Frederick II, Duke of Mecklenburg-Schwerin, called the Pious (9 November 171721 April 1785) was Duke of Mecklenburg-Schwerin from 1756 until his death.

Early life
Frederick was born at Schwerin, the son of Christian Ludwig II, Duke of Mecklenburg, and his wife, Duchess Gustave Caroline of Mecklenburg-Strelitz.

In his childhood and youth his great-aunt Duchess Augusta of Mecklenburg-Güstrow had great influence on the intellectual and spiritual development of Frederick, essentially in instilling the beliefs of Pietism.

Duke of Mecklenburg-Schwerin
After the death of his father in 1756, Frederick assumed the government of the Duchy. Shortly after his accession the country was involved in the Seven Years' War.

Frederick, was a supporter of Pietism. He encouraged the school system, promoted the textile manufacturing and abolished torture. In 1764 he moved his residence from Schwerin to Schloss Ludwigslust. In 1765 he ordered the construction of the Imperial Church (completed in 1770, now the City Church) by architect Johann Joachim Busch, and he continued the expansion of Schloss Ludwigslust between 1772 and 1776.

Marriage
Frederick married on 2 March 1746  at Schwedt to Duchess Louise Frederica of Württemberg, daughter of Frederick Louis, Hereditary Prince of Württemberg, and his wife Margravine Henrietta Maria of Brandenburg-Schwedt. They had four children, who died young.

At his death, the dukedom was inherited by his nephew Frederick Francis, a son of his brother Louis.

Ancestry

References

Genealogisches Handbuch des Adels, Fürstliche Häuser, Reference: 1956
Het Groothertogelijk Huis Mecklenburg, Bergen-op-Zoom, 1901–1902, Juten, W. J. F., Reference: 106

 

1717 births
1785 deaths
People from Schwerin
House of Mecklenburg-Schwerin
Dukes of Mecklenburg-Schwerin
German landowners